Charles Beilby Stuart-Wortley, 1st Baron Stuart of Wortley  (15 September 1851 – 24 April 1926), was a British Conservative politician who sat in the House of Commons from 1880 until 1916, shortly before he was raised to the peerage. He served as Under-Secretary of State for the Home Department between 1885–1886 and 1886–1892 in the Conservative administrations headed by Lord Salisbury.

Background and education
A member of the Stuart family headed by the Marquess of Bute, Stuart-Wortley was the son of James Stuart-Wortley, youngest son of James Stuart-Wortley, 1st Baron Wharncliffe, son of James Stuart-Wortley-Mackenzie, second son of Prime Minister John Stuart, 3rd Earl of Bute. His mother was the Hon. Jane Stuart-Wortley (born Lawley). He was educated at Rugby and Balliol College, Oxford and called to the bar at Inner Temple in 1876. He was secretary to the Royal Commission on the Sale of Benefices from 1879 to 1880.

Political career
In 1880 Stuart-Wortley was the first Conservative to be elected as a Member of Parliament for Sheffield, and when this constituency was broken up under the Redistribution of Seats Act 1885, he was elected in the 1885 general election as MP for the new Sheffield Hallam constituency. He served under Lord Salisbury as Under-Secretary of State for the Home Department between 1885 and 1886 and again from 1886 to 1892. In 1896 he was admitted to the Privy Council. Stuart-Wortley resigned from the House of Commons on 16 December 1916 and in 1917 he was raised to the peerage as Baron Stuart of Wortley, of the City of Sheffield.

Personal life
Lord Stuart of Wortley married Beatrice, daughter of Thomas and Theodosia Trollope (and niece of the author Anthony Trollope), in 1880. Beatrice died in July 1881 and Stuart married as his second wife Alice Sophia Caroline Millais (1862–1936), daughter of the artist John Everett Millais. Known to her family as Carrie, she and her husband shared an interest in music, playing the Grieg and Schumann concertos on two grand pianos at their home. Among her friends were the art critic Claude Phillips, the arts patron Frank Schuster, Lady Charles Beresford and the composer Edward Elgar to whom she was known as Alice and 'Windflower'.

He died in April 1926, aged 74, when the barony became extinct.

Honours
In October 1920, the Great Central Railway gave the name Lord Stuart of Wortley to one of their newly built 4-6-0 express passenger locomotives, no. 1168 of class 9P (LNER class B3). It carried the name until withdrawal in September 1946.

References

External links 
 

1851 births
1926 deaths
Conservative Party (UK) MPs for English constituencies
Members of the Privy Council of the United Kingdom
Barons in the Peerage of the United Kingdom
Politics of Sheffield
UK MPs 1880–1885
UK MPs 1885–1886
UK MPs 1886–1892
UK MPs 1892–1895
UK MPs 1895–1900
UK MPs 1900–1906
UK MPs 1906–1910
UK MPs 1910
UK MPs 1910–1918
UK MPs who were granted peerages
Charles
Barons created by George V
Church Estates Commissioners